In mathematical analysis, Clairaut's equation (or the Clairaut equation) is a differential equation of the form

where  is continuously differentiable. It is a particular case of the Lagrange differential equation. It is named after the French mathematician Alexis Clairaut, who introduced it in 1734.

Solution 

so

Hence, either

or

In the former case,  for some constant . Substituting this into the Clairaut's equation, one obtains the family of straight line functions given by

the so-called general solution of Clairaut's equation.

The latter case,

defines only one solution , the so-called singular solution, whose graph is the envelope of the graphs of the general solutions.

The parametric description of the singular solution has the form

where  is a parameter.

Examples 

The following curves represent the solutions to two Clairaut's equations:

In each case, the general solutions are depicted in black while the singular solution is in violet.

Extension 

By extension, a first-order partial differential equation of the form
 

is also known as Clairaut's equation.

See also

D'Alembert's equation
Chrystal's equation
Legendre transformation

Notes

References 

.

.

.

Ordinary differential equations